Čtyřkoly is a municipality and village in Benešov District in the Central Bohemian Region of the Czech Republic. It has about 800 inhabitants.

Administrative parts
The village of Javorník is an administrative part of Čtyřkoly.

References

Villages in Benešov District